The Civil Aeronautics Board (or CAB) is a government agency of the Philippines attached to the Department of Transportation tasked to regulate, promote and develop the economic aspect of air transportation in the Philippines and to ensure that existing CAB policies are adapted to the present and future air commerce of the Philippines.

The Board has supervisory and jurisdictional control over air carriers, general sales agents, cargo sales agents, and air freight forwarders, as well as their property, property rights, equipment, facilities and franchises.

References

External links

Civil Aeronautics Board Philippines

Civil aviation in the Philippines
Department of Transportation (Philippines)
Philippines